Iwájú is an upcoming American computer-animated television series produced by Walt Disney Animation Studios and the Pan-African British-based entertainment company Kugali Media for the streaming service Disney+. It is created and directed by Ziki Nelson. The series is the first "original long-form animated series" produced by Walt Disney Animation Studios in its history. The title of the series, iwájú, roughly translates to "the future" in the Yoruba language (literally "front-facing").

Originally a series of shorts, Walt Disney Animation Studios and Kugali Media were developing the long-form series for Disney+ by December 2020, with Nelson on board. The story drews inspiration the city of Lagos, Nigeria, due to Lagos being "the culture capital of Nigeria", and due to both its mainland and island areas having "a unique, distinct feel" that the creative team felt provided "an interesting base for the story". Cinesite was announced to co-produced the series in September 2021 with pre-production already underway at Cinesite Montereal. Produced began in May 2022. Animation is provided by both Cinesite's Montereal and London facilities, and Disney Animation's Vancouver studio, with pre-production and storyboards supervised at Disney's Burbank studio.

Iwájú is scheduled to premiere on Disney+ in 2023.

Synopsis
Set in a futuristic Lagos, Nigeria, the series will explore "deep themes of class, innocence and challenging the status quo".

Production

Development
Walt Disney Animation Studios chief creative officer Jennifer Lee read an article on BBC about Kugali Media, a British-based company founded by African artists, saying that they wanted to "kick Disney's arse". Intrigued by the company's desire to create and tell African stories, she approached them to develop together an original long-form science fiction animated project for The Walt Disney Company's streaming service, Disney+. The producers originally planned to create a series of shorts, but "each idea was an epic feature", so they choose to create a series instead.

On December 10, 2020, Lee announced that Walt Disney Animation Studios and Kugali Media would be co-producing a new original animated series for Disney+, titled Iwájú. It is Walt Disney Animation Studios' first original animated series, as most of Disney's television projects - original or based on pre-existing IP - are produced by Disney Television Animation. She described the collaboration between both companies as a "first of its kind collaboration".  The show is created and directed by Ziki Nelson. The title of the series, iwájú, roughly translates to "the future" in the Yoruba language (literally "front-facing").

In February 2021, the Kugali Media team said that Iwájú is not like World of Wakanda, with Kugali Media CEO Ziki Nelson saying they "took a real African city" (Lagos, Nigeria) and found ways to adapt it using their imagination, with Hamid Ibrahim, the creative director, clarifying that Disney Animation let them "be ourselves and...be true to ourselves," working with Disney with "a certain amount of autonomy and creative freedom". SYFY said this could "open the doors for other post-pandemic collaborations around the world". Toluwalakin "Tolu" Olowofoyeko, Chief Technology Officer of Kugali, is a creative consultant and consulting producer on the show, and Ziki Nelson, CEO of Kugali, wrote the story. In June 2021, Nelson, as he was signed to a talent management company, added that "storytelling through art and animation" has been his dream.

At the 2021 Annecy International Animation Film Festival, Olowofoyeko said that the story was inspired by the city of Lagos, Nigeria, due to Lagos being "the culture capital of Nigeria", and due to both its mainland and island areas having "a unique, distinct feel" that the creative team felt provided "an interesting base for the story". Nelson said that the series would be an "opportunity to give people a more holistic view of Nigeria" though it's "strange but wonderful city". Producers worked with several nations for the series, with visual effects director Marlon West saying that members of the team were hired from several departments, while head of story Natalie Nourigat described having a "virtual story room" composed of both Kugali and Disney employees as "a great way to introduce new people".

On September 7, 2021, it was reported that Cinesite will also co-produce the series, with pre-production already underway at Cinesite Montereal. It was also reported that Christina Chen and Joel MacDonald will produce the series.

In May 2022, EWN described the series as "in production" along with Kizazi Moto.

In July 2022 it was announced that the series would be featured among other upcoming Disney projects at the D23 Expo in September.

Animation
Animation will be handled in both Cinesite's Montereal and London facilities, and Disney Animation's Vancouver studio, with pre-production and storyboards supervised at Disney's Burbank studio. Hamid Ibrahim, the Creative Director of Kugali, is the production designer for the show. Ibrahim said that the show's animation style would differ from previous Disney productions with director Ziki Nelson saying that it will instead be inspired by African, Eastern, and Western animation styles, and visual effects director Marlon West adding that it will still have the same quality as other Disney projects. Ibrahim also said that the towers composing the mainland are of the series' main setting is meant to represent overcrowding, while the island area contains a bigger "space and room for creative expression". He added that technology is a crucial aspect of the setting, with the series featuring several advanced technologies, such as augmented reality glasses substituting smartphones and spherical flying cars.

Themes
Iwájú will explore themes of inequality and class divide, which director and Kugali co-founder Ziki Nelson described as "the everyday reality of life in Nigeria and other parts of the world". It will also explore how those issues affect everyday society, as well as "challenging the status quo". Nelson also described the show as about "inspiration, or aspiration and desire, to try and engineer society for living in a more positive way". Ibrahim also argued that the series represents a "personal childhood dream of mine to tell my story and that of my people".

Release
Iwájú was originally set to debut in 2022, exclusively on Disney's streaming service, Disney+.

At the 2021 Annecy International Animation Film Festival, on June 16, 2021, the crew behind the show discussed how the cartoon stands out, along with concept art for the series. The series was described by Ibrahim as a "Kugali-Disney mash-up," a collaboration between both companies, to which Jennifer Lee, the chief creative officer of Walt Disney Animation Studios, agreed, while Olowofoyeku said the show had a "very unique set-up for storytelling already built into the DNA of the real-life Lagos". Additionally, Nelson said the show's creative team built "a futuristic world rooted in the contemporary setting". In June 2021, it was said that the show would not be expected to premiere on Disney+ until 2023. The series is one of the two animated series based on Africa which will be released by Disney, with the other being Kizazi Moto: Generation of Fire, which will premiere in 2022.

In December 2021, at the Investors Day for Disney, details about the show's characters and plot were revealed.

In January 2022, it was revealed that the series will consist of six parts and be a long-form series. This was further confirmed in July 2022, when it was announced that a behind-the-scenes look at the series would be shown in a documentary series produced by ABC News Studios, a division of ABC News.

Reception

Pre-release
LuxeKurves Magazine praised the series for featuring "black African characters written and created by an African team," describing it as Afrofuturist. BBC News noted that the series will be the first time that Disney "will work with African storytellers to create an animated series set on the continent," implying the series is Afrofuturist. Business Insider said that the series is "set in a Wakanda-like world" while IOL called the series "steeped in science fiction". Native Magazine said the series will "highlight poignant West African stories told through animation and comic-book format," saying it is very important at a time with continued police brutality and government corruption in Nigeria, and will be "further cement the talent of African creatives on a global scale," with a story told through "African lenses". Tor.com described the series as Africanfuturist and said that by partnering with Disney, Kugali Media can "reach an ever broader audience, bringing their message around the globe".

Notes

References

External links

2020s American television series debuts
2020s American animated television series
Disney+ original programming
English-language television shows
Television shows set in Lagos
Walt Disney Animation Studios
Upcoming animated television series